Darrell Edmund Figgis (17 September 1882 – 27 October 1925) was an Irish writer, Sinn Féin activist and independent parliamentarian in the Irish Free State. The little that has been written about him has attempted to highlight how thoroughly his memory and works have been excised from Irish popular culture.

Early life
Darrell Figgis was born at Glen na Smoil, Palmerstown Park, Rathmines in Dublin, the son of Arthur William Figges, tea merchant, and Mary Anne Deane. While he was still an infant, his family emigrated to Calcutta in India. There his father worked as an agent in the tea business, founding A W Figgis & Co. They returned when Darrell was ten years of age, though his father continued to spend much of his time in India.

As a young man he worked in London at the tea brokerage owned by his uncle and it was at this time that he began to develop his interest in literature and literary criticism.

Literary career
In 1910 Figgis, with the help of G. K. Chesterton, who wrote the introduction to his first book of verse, joined the Dent publishing company. For much of his time with Dent, Figgis resided at 42 Asmuns Hill, Hampstead Gardens in London. He moved to Pollagh, Achill Island, in 1913 to write, learn Irish and (like others of the Gaelic Revival) gain an appreciation of Irish culture, as perceived by many of his contemporaries to uniquely exist on the western seaboard. On his detention following the Easter Rising, he and the publishing house 'parted company'. Subsequently, he established his own firm in which he republished the works of William Carleton and others.

Political life

Irish Volunteers and gun-running

Figgis joined the Irish Volunteers in Dublin in 1913 and organised the original Battalion of Volunteers in Achill, where he had built a house. While in London, he was contacted by The O'Rahilly, who acquainted him with the arms dealers who had supplied the Ulster Volunteers. In this way he became part of the London group that discussed the financing and supply of German rifles for the Volunteers. This group of gun-runners included Molly and Erskine Childers, Mary Spring Rice, Alice Stopford Green and Roger Casement. He travelled with Erskine Childers, initially to Belgium and from there to Germany to make the purchase of the army surplus Mauser rifles. Figgis then chartered the tug Gladiator, from which the arms were transferred at sea to the Childers' yacht Asgard and Conor O'Brien's Kelpie. As well as the Childers and Spring Rice, Asgard was crewed by Captain Gordon Shephard of the Royal Flying Corps, and Patrick McGinley and Charles Duggan, two fishermen from Gola Island, County Donegal.

At this time the Royal Navy was patrolling the Irish Sea in anticipation of imminent war with Germany, and Figgis was tasked with taking a motor boat to Lambay Island to signal to the Asgard the all-clear. By his own account, he was unable to persuade the skipper of the pilot vessel to put to sea, as one of the worst storms in many years had been raging. Due to luck and the skill of the crews, the three over-laden yachts arrived at their destinations. Figgis, accompanied by Seán McGarry, watched Asgard helplessly from Howth pier until Erskine, with Molly at the helm, decided to take a calculated risk and sailed into the harbour. Against the odds, the conspiracy with Casement, Eoin MacNeill and Bulmer Hobson to buy rifles in Germany and land them safely in Ireland had succeeded. A large party of Volunteers, on their way to Dublin with rifles and ammunition was confronted by a detachment of the King's Own Scottish Borderers and Dublin Metropolitan Police. With their route blocked, Figgis and Thomas MacDonagh engaged the officers in an attempt to distract them. Figgis gave much of the credit for co-ordinating the quiet dispersal of the Volunteers with their contraband to "Commandant Kerrigan, a former soldier."

Internment and 1917 by-election

Although he did not participate in the 1916 Easter Rising, Figgis was arrested and interned by the British authorities between 1916 and 1917 in Reading Gaol. His wife Millie wrote to The New Age, detailing her husband's conditions in jail and what she saw as the excessively broad terms by which he was interned under the Defence of the Realm Act 1914. After his release, Figgis returned to Ireland. At the 1917 Sinn Féin Ardfheis he and Austin Stack were elected Honorary Secretaries of the party. The conference saw Éamon de Valera replace Arthur Griffith as President of the party. Griffith and Michael O'Flanagan became Vice-Presidents. Two Honorary Treasurers were also elected, W. T. Cosgrave and Laurence Ginnell. This duality of offices reflected the coalition nature of Sinn Féin between those of the constitutional tradition, and those who advocated a more militarist approach. Shortly after, Figgis was one of four recently released internees who travelled to the South Longford constituency to campaign for Joseph McGuinness in the by-election caused by the death of John Phillips. The overwhelming victory of the Sinn Féin candidate over the Irish Parliamentary Party nominee marked the beginning of the eclipse of the latter party by the former party. In May 1918, Figgis was arrested for his alleged part in the spurious German Plot a second time and again deported to England. In 1918, he became editor of the newspaper The Republic.

Irish War of Independence (1919–1921)
From September 1919 to 1921 Figgis headed the Commission of Inquiry into the Resources and Industries of Ireland. At this time a serious rift between Figgis and Michael Collins, then Minister for Finance, became a matter of public record. This close attention of Collins would pursue Figgis in his later activities on the Constitution Committee.

While Figgis was participating in a Dáil Court at Carrick on Shannon, the proceedings were interrupted by a British Army raid. An officer named Captain Cyril Crawford summarily "condemned" Figgis and Peadar Kearney to be hanged. He ordered rope for the purpose, but another officer intervened and Keaney and Figgis were set free.

Truce
Figgis supported the Anglo-Irish Treaty. He was extremely critical of the Collins/De Valera Pact for the June 1922 elections which was an attempt to avoid a split in the Sinn Féin party and, more importantly, in the IRA. On 25 May 1922 he attended a meeting of the executive council of the Farmers' Union and representatives of business interests, and encouraged them to put forward candidates in constituencies where anti-Treaty candidates might otherwise have headed the poll. As Figgis was a member of the Sinn Féin Ard Chomhairle National Executive at the time, he was expelled from the party. This contravention of policy must be assessed in the light of the flagrant breaches of the terms of the Truce that were a daily occurrence at the time. These were an unambiguous indication that the IRA was not under the control of Dáil Éireann and efforts at party unity were to a certain extent cosmetic.

Assault by Republicans

On 13 June 1922, Dublin newspapers carried reports of an assault on Darrell Figgis which involved the cutting of his beard. The Evening Herald reported that shortly before midnight, Millie Figgis had answered a knock at the door. Three men rushed past her seeking out her husband. Mrs. Figgis, fearing that they intended to shoot him, pushed into the room and attempted to lock it but was prevented from doing so by the intruders. The paper went on to say that "Mrs. Figgis is suffering severely from shock". Details of the attack remained vague until one of those responsible broke his silence 36 years later.

This was future Lord Mayor of Dublin, Robert Briscoe, at the time of this disclosure the most prominent and respected politician from the Jewish community in Ireland. A less than sympathetic attitude to the attack was not confined to Anti-Treatyites. In a letter to Collins on 13 June, his fiancée Kitty Kiernan wrote the following:"Poor Darrell Figgis lost his nice red beard. When I read about it I could imagine you laughing and enjoying it very much. But it was a mean thing for Harry's cronies to do, wasn't it? Funny, this ages I've been expecting that something might happen to Figgis (from reading papers). He was lucky it was only his beard."

Constitution Committee

Soon after the signing of the Treaty, the necessity of quickly drafting a constitution for the proposed Free State became apparent. It was intended by Arthur Griffith that Figgis would chair the Constitution Committee, but this proposal was vetoed by Collins who nominated himself for the position specifically to minimise Figgis' influence. The animosity between Collins and Figgis remained an undercurrent of the project and in Collins' absence after the inaugural gathering, James G. Douglas, a Collins nominee, kept him briefed of developments by detailed weekly meetings. Douglas, who in his memoirs admitted his dislike for Figgis, brought with him onto the committee James McNeill, Clement J. France and R.J.P Mortished who had worked closely with him at the Irish White Cross thus consolidating further Collins' control. The mutual animosity between Figgis and Douglas stemmed from the early days of the Irish White Cross. Darrell Figgis had sought nomination as its Secretary. Douglas backed McNeill. In the end, Collins decided the job should go to Captain David Robinson, but this did nothing to heal the Figgis-Douglas rift.

Elections
In the 1922 and 1923 general elections he ran and was elected an independent Teachta Dála (member of parliament) for the Dublin County constituency.

While still a TD, he stood in the 1925 election to Seanad Éireann, where he polled only 512 first preferences.

Wireless Broadcasting Enquiry
In December 1923, it was decided that a committee be established to investigate the means by which a public radio broadcasting service should be operated in the Free State. A central issue of contention was whether the service should be run and controlled directly by the State or operated commercially by an Irish Broadcasting Company. The latter option, it was suggested, would follow the model adopted in the UK by the establishment of the BBC. Figgis was co-opted onto the committee, and this decision led to a series of allegations resulting in the new State's first corruption scandal of which Figgis himself was the focus.

A former business associate of Figgis, Andrew Belton, sent a letter to J. J. Walsh the Postmaster General. Walsh's own preferences for a private syndicate, which would include Belton and business acquaintances from Cork, together with his personal animosity towards Figgis, were evident from the outset. In the letter leaked by Walsh, Belton stated that Figgis had promised to use his political influence to assist him to gain government contracts. The accusation resulted in Figgis resigning from the Broadcasting committee and a second enquiry being launched to investigate these new allegations.

Figgis strenuously denied any impropriety, claiming they were motivated by personal animosity when Belton's expectations of preferential treatment were unfulfilled. Belton's apparent connections with senior finance and political figures in London, including Lord Beaverbrook, were also matters of considerable disquiet.

Personal life and suicide

Throughout his political career, Figgis' lobbying for remuneration was a constant source of resentment by his immediate colleagues. Many of them however, received income from their positions within the administration, or from private practice or both. The fact that Michael Collins, in his ministerial capacity, kept all official expenditure under minute scrutiny ensured that any transactions involving Figgis were subject to particularly detailed monitoring by Finance officials.

On 18 November 1924, Figgis' wife Millie committed suicide using a Webley revolver given to them by Collins following the 1922 assault. According to the inquest, she shot herself in the head in the back of a taxi in Rathfarnham, having previously ordered the driver to take her to the Hellfire Club. Two bullets in the gun were discharged. She was taken to the Meath Hospital and pronounced dead. A bloodstained suicide letter was handed by the Matron to Figgis when he arrived there. In her letter, Mrs. Figgis expressed her sorrow for the pain her action would cause to her husband and referred to injuries and depression arising from the 1922 attack. She was buried at Mount Jerome Cemetery, Dublin.

A year later, Figgis' new love, a 21-year-old Catholic woman named Rita North, died, due to medical difficulties, when Dr Lake tried to surgically remove an already dead child. The court, after investigating North's death, determined that she died, ‘due to peritonitis’ - and inflammation in the lining of the abdominal cavity. However, the public jumped to the conclusion that she died in a failed illegal abortion. Her body was brought back from London and she was buried by her family at Glasnevin Cemetery. Figgis himself committed suicide in a London boarding-house, in Granville Street, Finsbury, on 26 October 1925, just a week after giving evidence at North's inquest. He had been staying at the Royal Automobile Club until the day before his death, as was usual when he visited London. A small group of mourners comprising close family and friends attended his interment at the West Hampstead Cemetery.

The by-election caused by his death was won by William Norton of the Labour Party.

Works

A Vision of Life (1909) poems 
Shakespeare: A Study (1911) 
The Crucibles of Time (1911) poems 
Studies and Appreciations (1912) 
Broken Arcs (1912) novel 
Queen Tara (1913) play 
Jacob Elthorne (1914) novel as Michael Ireland 
The Mount of Transfiguration (1915) poems 
AE (George W. Russell). A Study of a Man and a Nation (1916) 
The Gaelic State in the Past & Future, or, "The Crown of a Nation" (1917)
A Chronicle of Jails (1917)
Bye-Ways of Study (1918) essays 
Children of Earth (1918) novel as Michael Ireland
The Historic Case for Irish Independence (1918) 
Carleton's Stories of Irish Life (1918/9) by William Carleton, editor
A Second Chronicle of Jails (1919)
Bogach Bán (1922) poem
The Economic Case for Irish Independence (1920) Planning for the Future (1922) address to the Architectural Association of IrelandThe House of Success (1922) novel as Michael IrelandThe Irish Constitution Explained (Dublin: Mellifont Press, 1922 The Return of the Hero (1923) novel, as Michael IrelandThe Paintings of William Blake (1925)John Milton and Darrell Figgis [editor]Comus: A Mask with Eight Illustrations By William Blake (1926) John Milton, editorRecollections of the Irish War (1927) 

Notes
References

Bibliography

 Briscoe, Robert & Alden R. Hatch: For the Life of Me: Little and Brown: Boston (1958) 
 Colum, Mary Maguire: Life and the Dream: Dolmen Press: Dublin (1966) 
 Douglas, James Green & Anthony J.Gaughan, (ed.): Memoirs of James G. Douglas- Concerned Citizen; .
 Hogan, Robert & Richard Burnham: The Years of O'Casey, 1921-1926- A Documentary History; 
 McInerney, Michael: The Riddle of Erskine Childers (Dublin 1971)
 Ó Broin, León (ed) In Great Haste: The Letters of Michael Collins and Kitty Kiernan; .
 Pine, Richard; 2RN and the Origins of Irish Radio''; .

External links

 Extract from A Chronicle of Jails (1917)
 Text of his poem Bogach Bán
 The Historic Case for Irish Independence (1918)
 Princess Grace Irish Library (Monaco)
 Century of Endeavour-Life and Times of Alice Stopford Green (ASG)(c) Roy Johnston 1999
 Dáil Éireann – Irish Free State – Early Debates on Wireless Broadcasting
 
 

1882 births
1925 deaths
Irish poets
Early Sinn Féin politicians
Members of the 3rd Dáil
Members of the 4th Dáil
Politicians from County Dublin
Irish politicians who committed suicide
Protestant Irish nationalists
Suicides in Islington
People of the Irish Civil War (Pro-Treaty side)
20th-century Irish poets
20th-century male writers
Independent TDs
1925 suicides
Suicides by gas